Federal Highway 130 (Carretera Federal 130) connects Tuxpan, Veracruz to Pachuca, Hidalgo. Federal Highway 130 includes a short 30 km (18.6 mi) connector route from south of Tuxpan to Tihuatlán that is not connected directly to the rest of the highway. The main segment of Federal Highway 130 begins in the east in Poza Rica, Veracruz.

Photos

References

130